Claire Weinstein (born March 1, 2007) is an American competitive swimmer, currently swimming for Las Vegas-based swim team Sandpipers of Nevada. At the 2022 World Aquatics Championships in Budapest, Hungary, Weinstein helped USA win the gold medal in the women's 4x200m freestyle.

Before swimming with the Sandpipers of Nevada, she previously swam for the Westchester Aquatic Club.

Early life 
She was born to Rodney and Diane Weinstein, has one older brother Michael, and three younger sisters, Mary, Sophie and Emma. She was raised in the Reform Judaism tradition, and had a Bat Mitzvah at the Reform synagogue of Congregation Kol Ami in White Plains, New York. She also attended the Highlands Middle School in White Plains. During the school year she swam competitively with the White Plains Varsity Swim team and also swam and competed year round on a club team Westchester Aquatics. For her Mitzvah project, Claire has been actively volunteering her time to help coach the younger swimmers in the Westchester Aquatic club swim school at inter-team meets and practices, because of her passion for the sport and belief that everyone should learn to swim and have the opportunity to be a competitive swimmer if they desire. On her behalf a donation was made to the Christopher Dewey Memorial Swim Foundation, that will assist low income swimmers with training fees and also fees to participate in travel competitions.

Swimming career

Early career
According to Westchester Aquatic Club head coach Carle Fierro, Weinstein would join the club at the age of six. Fierro described Weinstein as "extremely easy to coach and was really good at communicating how she felt in the water... In addition, she displayed a great singlemindedness in attaining goals. She was diligent about doing workouts and motivating team members to do their best as well."

2021 
In 2021, she would qualify for the 2020 United States Olympic trials, becoming one of the youngest swimmers to qualify for the trials. She would place 20th in the 400m freestyle, not qualifying for that year's 2020 Summer Olympics.

In September of 2021, Weinstein would move to Las Vegas, Nevada to train with the Sandpipers of Nevada.

2022 
On April 3, 2022, Weinstein would win the USA Swimming National and Junior Championship 5K event by over a minute.

At the 2022 USA Swimming International Team Trials, Weinstein would manage to qualify for the United States team in the 2022 World Aquatics Championships, in the process also becoming the fastest 15-year old in the United States to swim the 200m freestyle event.

World Championships 

At the 19th FINA World Championships Budapest 2022, she won a gold medal as a part of the United States Women's 4x200 relay at the age of 15. She also competed in the women's 200 meter freestyle, finishing in 10th place in the semifinals and missing finals qualification by only seven hundredths of a second.

See also
List of select Jewish swimmers

References

External links
 
 
 Claire Weinstein at SwimSwam

2007 births
Living people
American female freestyle swimmers
21st-century American women
Sportspeople from Westchester County, New York
Jewish American sportspeople
American Reform Jews
Jewish swimmers